Danius was a legendary king of the Britons as recounted by Geoffrey of Monmouth. He was son of Sisillius II, brother of Kinarius and was succeeded by his illegitimate son Morvidus.

References

Legendary British kings